Walter Meserve may refer to:
 Walter Joseph Meserve, American professor, playwright, critic, and author of books on theater
 Walter F. Meserve, mayor of Lynn, Massachusetts